The Motorola i860 was the first iDEN phone to feature a camera. The  VGA camera is equipped with a 10-second video record option and built-in ultra-bright spotlight.  As it was the first iDEN phone to feature a camera, it also was first to feature multimedia messaging as well as push-to-send, where contact information can be sent to another compatible device using the phone's push-to-talk button.

Its included demo games include Boulder Dash by Instacom ltd. and First Star Software. It also features a version of the classic card game spades, developed by Skava. The i860 is also capable of holding up to 80+ downloaded ringtones, as well as the standard Nextel 600-contact storage capability. As with most camera phones, the wallpaper can be replaced with any one of the user's pictures.

i860 features a GPS function, which can pinpoint ones exact location anywhere on earth where service is available, as well as a useful internet function, which can be used for text messages, sending pictures, and video from phone to phone, or from phone to computer. The useful "Recent Calls List" can show the user all incoming, outgoing and missed calls, and the phone is equipped with an easy-to-use datebook which can alert the user (at ones convenience) to an upcoming task.

The i860 features coast to coast walkie-talkie capability, intended to reduce cell phone traffic.

See also
 Motorola iDEN phone models
 Sprint Nextel
 Telus

External links
 Motorola i860 product page
 Motorola i860 Specs

I860
IDEN mobile phones
Digital audio players